Willamina Creek is a tributary, about  long, of the South Yamhill River in the U.S. state of Oregon. Beginning in the Northern Oregon Coast Range in Yamhill County, it briefly enters and exits a small part of eastern Tillamook County, then flows generally south to meet the larger stream at Willamina, near the border with Polk County.

Course
The road follows the creek from here to Willamina. Turning west, the creek passes over Willamina Falls between river miles (RM) 17 and 16 (river kilometers 27 and 26) and enters Tillamook County. It passes Buck Hollow Cemetery and then flows through Blackwell Park at about RM 5 (RK 8). Named tributaries of Willamina Creek from source to mouth are Cedar, East, Coast, and Tindle creeks.

Waterfall
The waterfall is on private land.

Recreation
The  site offers stream views, picnic sites, fishing, barbecue pits, and a public toilet. Two families named Blackwell donated the land for the park in 1957.

Fishing in Oregon calls the creek "a good little trout stream".

See also
List of rivers of Oregon

References

External links
Yamhill River watershed map

Rivers of Tillamook County, Oregon
Rivers of Yamhill County, Oregon
Rivers of Oregon